James Luke Newton Walker (born 25 November 1987) is an English former professional footballer who played as a striker.

Career

Charlton Athletic
Walker was released by Charlton in 2006, but was invited back on a trial by new manager Iain Dowie during pre-season, and he impressed by scoring against Millwall, Germinal Beerschot and Hibernian, earning a new one-year contract.

He has loan spells with Hartlepool United, Bristol Rovers (where he scored his first career goal against Boston United), Leyton Orient, Notts County and Yeovil Town. He is a former England under-18 international.

On 23 November 2006, Walker joined Leyton Orient on a two-month loan deal. He scored with his final touch for the club in a 5–2 away win against Millwall on 20 February 2007. He joined Notts County on loan in March 2007 and later joined Yeovil Town on a three-month loan in October 2007. There is a popular chant that fans scream at his matches which is "We appreciate James". There are even multiple facebook groups called "The James Appreciation Club".

Southend United
After returning in January 2008, he was close to joining another League One side, Southend United, for £200,000. However, the move was cancelled after he was discovered to have an irregular heart rhythm after he failed a medical. The following month he was signed on loan by Southend, and scored on his debut against AFC Bournemouth.

At the start of Southend's 2008–09 season, Walker was used as a winger rather than a striker. On 13 December 2008, in the club's League One game against Huddersfield Town, Walker missed a penalty which would have put Southend on level terms, instead Southend slipped to a 1–0 defeat. On 20 January 2009, Walker came off the bench against Leyton Orient to rescue a point in the sixth minute of injury time with an individual effort after taking on four defenders.

On 22 September 2009, Walker joined Hereford United on a month's loan spell. He made his debut in a 4–1 loss to Rochdale on 26 September 2009. He then scored his first goal against Dagenham & Redbridge on 3 October 2009, and his second goal followed three days later in a Football League Trophy tie against Aldershot Town.

Hereford were keen to extend Walker's loan but after his initial month he wanted to return to Southend to fight for his place in their side.

Gillingham
On 1 February 2010 he agreed to have his Southend contract terminated and joined Gillingham on a free transfer. He made his debut in 4–0 defeat to Brentford. Walker was released at the end of the season.

Leyton Orient
In September 2010, Walker joined Leyton Orient on a three-month deal, which was later extended by another month. He left the club when this deal expired on 11 January 2011, having made 14 appearances in all competitions without scoring, although he was almost always used as a late substitute.

On 16 February 2011 Walker joined Grimsby Town on trial.

Woking
On 3 March 2011, Walker signed for Conference South side Woking on a contract until the end of the season.

Dover Athletic
In July 2011, Walker signed for Conference South side Dover Athletic after a successful pre-season trial. He was released at the end of the season.

Eastbourne Borough
In August 2012, Walker signed for Conference South side Eastbourne Borough after a successful pre-season trial.

While at Eastbourne, Walker was called up to play for Antigua and Barbuda, coming on as a second-half substitute against Guatemala in a 2014 World Cup qualifier.

Walker left Eastbourne for personal reasons on 26 February 2013.

Albany Creek Excelsior
Walker moved to Australia with former Eastbourne Borough player Marvin Hamilton to play in the Brisbane Premier League for Albany Creek Excelsior. His first game was against UQFC on 29 June.

Return to Eastbourne Borough
In August 2014, Walker re-signed for Conference South side Eastbourne Borough after a successful pre-season trial. However, with fitness problems and not scoring in his first 15 appearances Walker was told by manager Tommy Widdrington that he could start to look for a new club.

Bishop's Stortford

Walker signed for Bishop's Stortford on 9 December 2014.

East Thurrock United

Walker joined East Thurrock United for the 2015/16 season. He scored his first goal in an FA Cup tie against Carshalton Athletic.

Tilbury
Walker signed for Tilbury for the 2018-2019 season.

Personal Life
Alongside playing football, Walker was working as a PE Teacher at Ramsden Hall Academy in Billericay.

In February 2019, Walker suffered a  cardiac arrest and he was left with physical and mental impairments and now lives in a 24-hour care home in Southend-on-Sea.

References

External links

1987 births
Living people
Footballers from Hackney, London
English footballers
England youth international footballers
English sportspeople of Antigua and Barbuda descent
Antigua and Barbuda footballers
Antigua and Barbuda international footballers
Association football forwards
Charlton Athletic F.C. players
Hartlepool United F.C. players
Bristol Rovers F.C. players
Leyton Orient F.C. players
Notts County F.C. players
Yeovil Town F.C. players
Southend United F.C. players
Hereford United F.C. players
Gillingham F.C. players
Woking F.C. players
Dover Athletic F.C. players
Eastbourne Borough F.C. players
Albany Creek Excelsior FC players
Bishop's Stortford F.C. players
East Thurrock United F.C. players
Canvey Island F.C. players
Maldon & Tiptree F.C. players
Tilbury F.C. players
English Football League players